Zubat may refer to:

 Zubatto, a Japanese onomatopoeia referring to the sound of something that is hit directly on its target
 Zubat (Pokémon), a fictional species from the Pokémon series
 Kaiketsu Zubat, Japanese television series